The 1952 Western Kentucky Hilltoppers football team represented Western Kentucky State College (now known as Western Kentucky University) in the 1952 college football season. They were coached by Jack Clayton and shared their first Ohio Valley Conference football championship and won their first bowl game, the Refrigerator Bowl. The team was led by college division AP All-American and All-OVC Quarterback Jimmy Feix and matched the school record for most wins set in 1922. R. E. Simpson, Marvin Satterly, Gene McFadden, and Max Stevens were also named to the All-OVC team. The team's captains were Dave Miller and Denny Wedge.

Schedule

References

Western Kentucky
Western Kentucky Hilltoppers football seasons
Ohio Valley Conference football champion seasons
Western Kentucky Hilltoppers football